Cohen & Gresser LLP is an international law firm with offices in New York City, Paris, Washington D.C., and London. The firm represents clients in complex litigation and corporate transactions throughout the world. Founded in 2002, the firm has grown to seventy lawyers in eight practice groups: Corporate; Employment; Intellectual Property & Technology; Litigation and Arbitration; Privacy and Data Security; Real Estate; Tax; White Collar Defense. The firm's clients include Fortune 500 companies and major financial institutions across a broad spectrum of industries throughout the world, and it has litigated and negotiated against some of the nation's largest law firms.

Offices
Cohen & Gresser is headquartered in New York City.

Cohen & Gresser's French office opened in early 2014. The firm's Paris office is located on Rue La Boétie, in the 8th arrondissement. Cohen & Gresser partner Johannes Jonas leads the Paris office and is licensed to practice law in France, Germany, and New York. The office has a particular focus on cross-border transactions and investments, mergers and acquisitions, litigation, tax, and employment law.

Cohen & Gresser's Washington, D.C. office opened in 2016 and is led by partner Melissa H. Maxman. The office handles a range of commercial litigation and regulatory enforcement actions, with a focus on domestic and foreign antitrust issues.

Opened in 2018, Cohen & Gresser's London office is led by Jeffrey M. Bronheim and focuses on investing and investments, including hedge funds, private equity and lending structures, investors, management companies, and transactions, and cross-border litigation and investigations.

Practices

Corporate
Cohen & Gresser assists clients in a wide range of corporate matters, including mergers and acquisitions, private equity and venture capital financing, fund formation, corporate governance, and securities law compliance. The firm's attorneys represent public companies, early-stage and late-stage private companies, venture capital and private equity funds, hedge funds, and investment banks. The firm also serves as outside general counsel to a number of privately held companies and regularly counsels clients on executive compensation and employment issues.

Intellectual Property & Technology
Cohen & Gresser represents clients in patent, trademark, copyright, trade secret, and unfair competition matters.

Government Relations

Litigation and Arbitration
Cohen & Gresser litigation and arbitration group handles major cases in federal and state courts, before government agencies, and in a variety of domestic and international arbitration settings under the AAA, LCIA, ICC, FINRA, and UNCITRAL Arbitration Rules.

White Collar Defense
The firm's white collar defense group represents corporations and individuals in federal and state regulatory investigations, proceedings before self-regulatory organizations, corporate internal investigations, and white collar criminal cases.

Rankings & Awards
The firm has been recognized in Chambers, Legal 500, Managing IP, U.S. News & World Report’s “Best Law Firms,”  Décideurs, and Benchmark Litigation. They have also been named to The National Law Journal’s “Midsize Hot List” and the BTI Client Service A-Team, and nearly half of their U.S.-based attorneys have been recognized by Super Lawyers.

Attorneys
Some of the firm's attorney's have served as former prosecutors, including former Assistant U.S. Attorneys for the Southern and Eastern Districts of New York, and as in-house counsel to major corporations. Some also serve as executive members of New York Lawyers for the Public Interest, the Citizens Budget Commission, New York Council of Defense Lawyers, and the American Bar Association and as adjunct professors in nearby law schools.

Diversity
Cohen & Gresser is a signatory to the New York City Bar Association Statement of Diversity Principles, which affirms the commitment of its signatory law firms and corporate law departments to adopt specific diversity goals and practices, such as forming diversity committees, holding trainings, and developing other practices designed to enhance diversity.

Clients
Among Cohen & Gresser's clients are Goldman Sachs, Samsung Electronics, LG Electronics, Chesapeake Energy, Hyundai Rotem, Southwest Airlines, Bank of America, L’Oréal, Ghislaine Maxwell,  and Sam Bankman-Fried.

In 2022, ex-FTX CEO Sam Bankman-Fried hired Cohen & Gresser to represent him amidst the federal probe into the cryptocurrency exchange's collapse.

Publications
The Firm also regularly submits by-lined articles about current legal issues, new case law, and law firm management to the New York Law Journal and other publications.

References

Law firms based in New York City